Çük (Çuq;  or ; Cyrillic: Чук, Чүк, Чӳк, Чӱк) was a holiday of Keräşen Tatars, Chuvashes, Udmurts, preserved before the beginning of 20th century. It was celebrated as summer, before the Whitsunday or at the Poqraw eve (The Intercession). Commoners arranged a collective meal, and called for rain. Recent years Çük is celebrated in several districts of Tatarstan and is held in the manner of Sabantuy, in Chuvash чӳке(н) - rinse.

See also
Sabantuy
Baltai

Sources

 Chuvash Çük and other Chuvash holidays

Tatar culture
Cultural history of Russia
Festivals in Russia
Indigenous peoples days